Kodiak College is a public, two-year college in Kodiak, Alaska, that is a satellite campus of the University of Alaska Anchorage. It has a student body of approximately 1,000 and is also home to the Carolyn Floyd Library.

History
In 1968, Kodiak College opened. There were only eight courses available with a total of 95 students enrolled in the college's first year, and all courses were personally taught by Carolyn Floyd. In 1972, Kodiak had completed its first building that was dedicated to classrooms allowing for the college's first departure from the High School campus onto its own. In 1987, Kodiak College changed its previous designation as a community college to be absorbed by and be an extension to the University of Alaska Anchorage.

During the winter semester of 2014, there were 915 students enrolled and approximately 100 courses were offered each semester. The college employs approximately 50 faculty members each semester. Kodiak College's only bachelor's degree is in education; there are multiple associate degree options.

Academics

Two-Year Degrees
Associate of Arts, General Program (AA)
Accounting (AAS)
Computer Information & Office System (AAS)
Computer Systems Technology (AAS)
Early Childhood Education (AAS)
General Business (AAS)
Nursing (AAS)
Technology [applied/vocational] (AAS)

Certificates

Computer Information and Office Systems
Office Foundations
Office Support
Bookkeeping Support
Medical Office Support
Office Digital Media
Technical Support

Other Certificates
Health Care Assistant

References

External links
 

1968 establishments in Alaska
Buildings and structures in Kodiak Island Borough, Alaska
Community colleges in Alaska
Education in Kodiak Island Borough, Alaska
Kodiak, Alaska
University of Alaska Anchorage
Educational institutions established in 1968